Antheluridae is a family of crustaceans belonging to the order Isopoda.

Genera:
 Ananthura Barnard, 1925
 Anthelura Norman & Stebbing, 1886
 Anthomuda Schultz, 1979

References

Isopoda